Staufen refers to:

Hohenstaufen, a dynasty of German emperors
Staufen im Breisgau, a town in Baden-Württemberg, Germany
Staufen, Aargau, in Switzerland
Staufen (protein), a protein found in the egg of Drosophila
Staufen, Austria, a mountain in the western part of Austria